Christopher Cheung Wah-fung, JP (born 2 May 1952 in Fujian, China) is the founder and chief executive officer of Christfund Securities and a former member of the Legislative Council of Hong Kong representing the Financial Services constituency.

Background
Cheung founded Christfund in 1980, which was re-organised as Christfund Securities Limited in 1987. He began serving in the Election Committee for Financial Services constituency. Between 1997 and 2000, Cheung was a councillor for the Hong Kong Stock Exchange. Beginning in 2003, he was a non-executive director in multiple holding limited companies including Fuijian Holding, Tongda Financial, and First China Financial.  He was an observer for the Independent Police Complaints Council in Hong Kong until 2007.

In 2012, Cheung was elected a member of Legislative Council of Hong Kong, representing the Financial Services functional constituency. He retained his seat in the 2016 election, securing 51 percent of the 507 votes cast.

In November 2020, while Chief Executive Carrie Lam was giving her Annual Policy speech, Cheung was filmed not paying attention and texting someone to arrange the pickup of HK$9,600 worth of hairy crabs by his driver.

Honours
In 2000, Cheung was appointed as Justice of Peace by Tung Chee Hwa.

References

External links
 Christfund

1952 births
Living people
Politicians from Quanzhou
Alumni of the City University of Hong Kong
Business and Professionals Alliance for Hong Kong politicians
Democratic Alliance for the Betterment and Progress of Hong Kong politicians
HK LegCo Members 2012–2016
HK LegCo Members 2016–2021
Members of the Selection Committee of Hong Kong
Members of the Election Committee of Hong Kong, 1998–2000
Members of the Election Committee of Hong Kong, 2000–2005
Members of the Election Committee of Hong Kong, 2007–2012
Members of the Election Committee of Hong Kong, 2012–2017